Tolophon, also Tolphon (Τολφών), was a town of the Ozolian Locrians, possessing a large harbour according to Dicaearchus.

Its site is located near modern Agioi Pantes/Vidavi/Marmara.

References

Populated places in Ozolian Locris
Former populated places in Greece